Badri Liparteliani (born February 7, 1996) is a Georgian Rugby Union player. His position is Center and he currently plays for RC Armazi in Georgian championship and the. He was named in Georgia's squad for the 2017 Rugby Europe Championship. He made his debut against Spain.

References 

1995 births
Living people
Rugby union players from Georgia (country)
Georgia international rugby union players
Rugby union centres